North Head may mean or refer to:

 North Head, New South Wales is a headland at the entrance to Sydney Harbour (Sydney Heads)
 North Head, a promontory in the state of Washington, USA, north of the mouth of the Columbia River, the site of North Head Light
 North Head, New Zealand, a volcanic cone headland in North Shore City, New Zealand, at the east end of the Waitemata Harbour
 North Head, Wick Bay, one of the headlands at the entrance to Wick Bay, Highland, Scotland
  (formerly SS Barrenjoey), a ferry operated by the Port Jackson & Manly Steamship Company and its successors on the Manly service from 1913 until 1985